Aarón Guillén (born 23 June 1993) is a Mexican professional footballer who plays as a defender for USL Championship club Tampa Bay Rowdies.

Career

Professional
After four years of college soccer at Florida Gulf Coast University, Guillén signed a homegrown player contract with FC Dallas on January 5, 2016.

He made his professional debut on June 15, 2016 in a US Open Cup match against Oklahoma City Energy.

On August 5, 2017, Guillén was sent on a short-term loan to United Soccer League club Tulsa Roughnecks.

Honours
Tampa Bay Rowdies
USL Championship Eastern Conference: 2020
USL Championship Regular Season Title: 2021

Individual
USL Championship All League First Team: 2022
USL Championship All League Second Team: 2021

References

External links
 
 FC Dallas player profile

1993 births
Living people
Mexican expatriate footballers
Mexican footballers
Florida Gulf Coast Eagles men's soccer players
Austin Aztex players
FC Dallas players
FC Tulsa players
North Carolina FC players
Tampa Bay Rowdies players
Association football defenders
Soccer players from Texas
Expatriate soccer players in the United States
USL League Two players
Major League Soccer players
USL Championship players
Homegrown Players (MLS)
People from Chihuahua City